Producing Parker is an adult animated television sitcom that debuted May 4, 2009 on TVtropolis. Episodes began airing on Global in fall 2009.

The plot revolves around the behind-the-scenes antics of a female-targeted daytime television talk show, and stars Parker Kovak (Kristin Booth), the producer of "The Dee Show", and Dee (Kim Cattrall), its self-absorbed and high maintenance host. The show's cast also includes Peter Keleghan and Aaron Abrams.

Kim Cattrall was awarded a Gemini for "Best Performance in an Animated Program or Series" in 2010.

Production

The series is co-produced by Breakthrough Animation and Philippine Animators Group Inc. in association with CanWest Global and was confirmed for a second season set for February 2011. The second season officially premiered April 8, 2011 on Canada's TVtropolis. The series was not renewed for a third season.

Characters

Parker Kovak (voiced by Kristin Booth): The overworked, underpaid daytime talk show producer of The Dee Show. A kind-hearted but mildly neurotic woman in her late twenties. She is of Eastern-European descent.
Dee (voiced by Kim Cattrall): The ageless, alcoholic, nymphomaniac, very glamorous and very high maintenance star of The Dee Show. She was raised by a family of cougars in the California mountains.
Simon Nolan (voiced by Aaron Abrams): The left wing, slacker writer for The Dee Show, and Parker's good friend who has a relatively secret crush on her.
Chicago Hyatt (voiced by Sarah Cornell): Parker's attractive, yet under-qualified "loose" blonde intern, as well as her unwitting confidant. She is also Blake's third cousin.
Blake Bellamy (voiced by Peter Keleghan): The young, charming, absent-minded British station owner of Bellamy Broadcasting, and cousin of Chicago. Parker has a crush on him and he has, as he puts it, "some sort of feeling" for her.
Massimo (voiced by Jamie Watson): Parker's talking dog, and her main companion. A refined canine friend who enjoys the fine arts, good wine and endlessly chasing his own tail.
Hal (voiced by David Huband): Handy man and operator on The Dee Show. Also known to be a contractor/olympic diver/dog groomer/ordained satanist minister.
Russell (voiced by Jamie Watson): Dee's flamboyant, image-driven gay personal stylist and best friend.
Victoria Lafayette (voiced by Karen LeBlanc): Victoria is the charitative host of The Victoria Show whom Dee sees as her enemy and who once hired Parker as her producer. She runs several international charities. She physically resembles Queen Latifah and her personality is similar to Oprah's.
Antique Annie (voiced by Julie Lemieux) She is the elderly host of an Antiques roadshow style show. In the episode "Dee Mother Load" it is hinted that she is Dee's biological mother.
Dr. William Perry (voiced by Martin Roach): A chemist and relationship fidelity expert who is featured as a recurrent guest on The Dee Show and also acts as a de facto physician for the show's crew.
James Hard (voiced by Peter Keleghan): Television news anchor of "Hard News Report"
Jeremy: Chicago's friend and lover, and also works as the mail carrier of The Dee Show.

Episode list

Season 1

1. "Producing Parker" (pilot): Parker Kovak hopes to get promoted to producer of "The Dee Show", and first meets her attractive but promiscuous intern, Chicago.  Meanwhile, Dee is upset about the small size of her bottom.

2. "Model Moms": Dee orders Parker to get her a baby after a segment from the Model Moms; however, once she gets them, the babies happen to be conjoined and Dee decides to have them get plastic surgery.

3. "The Skinny On Parker": Dee decides to become obese for higher ratings and Parker begins dating Günter Fürst, an action star and former Republican senator turned fitness guru who takes her on extreme action movie work-outs. When she realizes the work-outs really make her lose weight, Parker begins getting obsessed with physical fitness.

4. " A Friend In Dee": Dee decides to become friends with Parker, and Parker finds Dee to be an irritating friend. Meanwhile, Simon uses his skills to try and expose the horrific problems of a third-world spa resort while failing to realize that he is actually the one causing the problems.

5. "Renovating Parker": "The Dee Show" decides to get a makeover after Dee's floor partly breaks.  Dee orders Parker to find her a hot and attractive contractor. Parker uses Hal and turns him into a hunky contractor, but things start to get worse as Hal decides to abandon "The Dee Show" and move to the  rival "The Victoria Show".

6. "Dog Dee Afternoon": Dee kicks Parker's dog 'Massimo' while on-the-air, which creates a controversy that might cost Parker her job.

7. "In Dee Club": Dee tries to become a lesbian after a break-out scandal involving her rival Victoria Lafayette and a Catholic nun; meanwhile, Parker dates a robot which she eventually decides to bring to her family wedding.

8. "And Dee Winner Is...": After she doesn't get nominated for a Blabby Award, Dee goes into a mad frenzy. When Parker gets nominated for a Blabby instead, Dee goes over the edge and joins a group called Losers Anonymous, which teaches her to let go of her ambition. Meanwhile, Simon runs a betting pool on when and how Dee will have a nervous breakdown.

9. "Age Dee-fying": Dee mutates into a half-woman/half snake when being treated with poisonous snake venom.  Simon undertakes a mission to determine Dee's age using Antique Annie.

10. "Mentoring Parker": With Chicago leaving for a role in a movie, Parker finally has the chance to hire a perfect intern. But when Dee gave an audience member the job position, she turns out to be more reliable than she expected. But is this audience member too good to be true or something else?

11. "Eat, Pray, Parker": After reading "Feast, Ride, Salsa," Parker decides to go shop for a motorcycle. Meanwhile, Dee gets ready for her bookclub segment on the show with the guest author, Jackie Cartwright of the book Parker (and eventually Dee) read. But is Parker's guest hiding something?

12. "A Recipe For Dee-saster": Dee bakes some cookies on the show. But when she eats one, Dee chokes on it and becomes unconscious (almost dies). That prompts a T.V. private detective to come in, ask and put Parker in hot water as the person of interest and soon the prime suspect. Will Parker be guilty as charged?

13. "All About Dee": When a guest on the Dee Show is an author of a book on how to be selfish, Dee decides to marry him. Meanwhile, Parker gets a call from none other than Victoria Lafayette, Dee's nemesis, offering her a job at the Victoria Show. But when Dee's wedding demands starts to mount on Parker, she had enough of Dee and her demands. So she does the inevitable and works for Victoria, while leaving a stressed out Dee and a planned televised wedding. Will Parker come back in time and help Dee say "I do?"

Season 2

14. "Bully For Parker": Parker puts Simon in charge of his first story and learns to never do that again when she becomes the focus of his segment and is forced to confront her high school bully, Tyler Van Bustle (voiced by guest star Jason Priestley), live on The Dee Show. Dee learns that she can be a bit a bully when Russell confronts her about her behavior.

15. "Man Trap": Parker believes she's a great matchmaker and forces Simon to participate in The Dee Show's matchmaking show. However, it turns out that Parker and Simon have very different ideas of the kind of girl he should end up with.

16. "The Dee Block": Dee steals Victoria's Nobel Peace prize and Parker forces her to break into Victoria's corporate headquarters to put it back. It's too bad for both of them that they get caught breaking in and get sent straight to jail.

17. "Giving Up Dee Ghost": After his plane crashes in the tundra, Blake Bellamy is presumed dead and his ghost begins to haunt Parker, who believes that his ghost is hanging around to confess his love for her. Meanwhile, The Dee Show features "The Ghost Shouter", a woman who can make ghosts talk through her to the living, which upsets Dee because no ghost wants to talk to her.

18. "Lying Cheating Dirty Dogs": Parker becomes infuriated when Massimo begins to spend more time with his dog walker, Sally, than with her; though Massimo and Sally's friendship runs stale when Massimo becomes the subject of Sally's dark, little secret. Meanwhile, Dee does everything in her power to sleep with her guest on the show, Dr. William Perry, an expert in marital fidelity.

19. "15 Minutes Of Parker": When Bellamy research indicates that Dee's no longer relatable to her viewers, Blake decides to give her a co-host the average female viewer can relate to—Parker.

20. "How Green Was My Parker": Parker is introduced to the world of environmentalism when she meets a cute activist named Ethan.

21. "Deehab": The crew of the Dee Show go into a rehab clinic and sign Dee up for alcoholism therapy so they can get inside and sign up famous Australian actor Lance Parfait for an interview. However, while staying there, the clinic's owner Dr. Chang concludes that Parker is a workaholic and the crew has her committed to undergo rehab therapy.

22. "Dee Mother Load": Blake asks Parker to travel with him to a television conference but Parker has to deal with her mother (voiced by guest star Catherine Disher) visiting unexpectedly. In order to distract her mother, Parker tells Dee (who never knew her mother and was instead raised by a family of cougars) to spend time with her mother to see what a mother-daughter bond feels like.

23. "Parker vs. Parker": When Victoria Lafayette retires, The Dee Show gets a new guest booker called Zach Parker, whom Parker becomes jealous of. After an alien spaceship crashes on a suburban home, Parker and Zach compete to see who can book the aliens for an interview first. Meanwhile, Dee wins a Blabby for a show in which she interviewed the Jesus Christ and tries to rub her success in the retired Victoria's face.

24. "Parker 3.0": Blake sells the Bellamy network to new owners which consist of a giant computer looking to get rid of anybody deemed unneeded.

25. "Real Men Eat Parker": Determined to become more manly, Simon begins taking special "mAn" pills that Dr. Perry gives him. After the results become clear, Parker asks Simon out on a date, during which he accidentally overdoses on the pills and discovers that a side effect is lycanthropy. Simultaneously, Parker competes against Dee for the presidency of the station's women's union.

26. "The Parker Prophecies": Dee uses a time machine to turn back the clock and become a teenager again while Parker uses the same machine to get a glimpse of her future. When Parker doesn't like what she sees, she impulsively changes her future by marrying Blake.

References

External links

2009 Canadian television series debuts
2011 Canadian television series endings
2000s Canadian adult animated television series
2000s Canadian sitcoms
2010s Canadian adult animated television series
2010s Canadian sitcoms
2000s Canadian workplace comedy television series
2010s Canadian workplace comedy television series
2000s Canadian animated comedy television series
2010s Canadian animated comedy television series
Canadian adult animated comedy television series
Canadian animated sitcoms
English-language television shows
Global Television Network original programming
Television series about television
Television series by Breakthrough Entertainment